Jeannot Krecké (born 26 April 1950 in Luxembourg City) is a Luxembourgish politician of the Luxembourg Socialist Workers' Party. He is a former Luxembourgian football (soccer) player.

Football career
Krecké played football as a midfielder, and appeared 11 times for the Luxembourg national team.

Political career
Krecké was a member of the Juncker-Asselborn Ministry I and II, holding the positions of Minister for the Economy and Foreign Trade and Minister for Sport. He was also a member of the Eurogroup from July 2004 to June 2009. He resigned from the latter on 1 February 2012.

Krecké announced that he will be resigning from the Cabinet and stepping down in February 2012.

Later career
Krecké is currently the CEO of Key International Strategy Services. In addition, he holds the following positions: 
 ArcelorMittal, Non-Executive Member of the Board of Directors
 Calzedonia Finanziaria SA, Member of the Board of Directors
 East-West United Bank SA, Member of the Board of Directors
 Jan De Nul, Member of the Board of Directors
 NovEnergia, Member of the Management Team
 (formerly) Sistema, Member of the Board of Directors

References

External links
 Government biography

1950 births
Living people
Ministers for the Economy of Luxembourg
Members of the Chamber of Deputies (Luxembourg)
Members of the Chamber of Deputies (Luxembourg) from Centre
Councillors in Luxembourg City
Luxembourg Socialist Workers' Party politicians
Luxembourgian educators
Vrije Universiteit Brussel alumni
People from Luxembourg City
Luxembourgian footballers
FC Avenir Beggen players
FC Aris Bonnevoie players
FC Etzella Ettelbruck players
FC Progrès Niederkorn players
Association football defenders
Luxembourg international footballers
Luxembourgian expatriate footballers
Expatriate footballers in Belgium
Luxembourgian expatriate sportspeople in Belgium